Earth's crust is Earth's thick outer shell of rock, referring to less than 1% of Earth's radius and volume. It is the top component of the lithosphere, a division of Earth's layers that includes the crust and the upper part of the mantle. The lithosphere is broken into tectonic plates whose motion allows heat to escape from the interior of the Earth into space.

The crust lies on top of the mantle, a configuration that is stable because the upper mantle is made of peridotite and is therefore significantly denser than the crust. The boundary between the crust and mantle is conventionally placed at the Mohorovičić discontinuity, a boundary defined by a contrast in seismic velocity.

Composition 

The crust of Earth is of two distinct types:

In a few places, such as the Tibetan Plateau, the Altiplano, and the eastern Baltic Shield, the continental crust is thicker ( to ). 

Because both continental and oceanic crust are less dense than the mantle below, both types of crust "float" on the mantle. The surface of the continental crust is significantly higher than the surface of the oceanic crust, due to the greater buoyancy of the thicker, less dense continental crust (an example of isostasy). As a result, the continents form high ground surrounded by deep ocean basins.

The continental crust has an average composition similar to that of andesite, though the composition is not uniform, with the upper crust averaging a more felsic composition similar to that of dacite, while the lower crust averages a more mafic composition resembling basalt. The most abundant minerals in Earth's continental crust are feldspars, which make up about 41% of the crust by weight, followed by quartz at 12%, and pyroxenes at 11%.

All the other constituents except water occur only in very small quantities and total less than 1%.

Continental crust is enriched in incompatible elements compared to the basaltic ocean crust and much enriched compared to the underlying mantle. The most incompatible elements are enriched by a factor of 50 to 100 in continental crust relative to primitive mantle rock, while oceanic crust is enriched with incompatible elements by a factor of about 10.

The estimated average density of the continental crust is 2.835 g/cm3, with density increasing with depth from an average of 2.66 g/cm3 in the uppermost crust to 3.1 g/cm3 at the base of the crust.

In contrast to the continental crust, the oceanic crust is composed predominantly of pillow lava and sheeted dikes with the composition of mid-ocean ridge basalt, with a thin upper layer of sediments and a lower layer of gabbro.

Formation and evolution 

Earth formed approximately 4.6 billion years ago from a disk of dust and gas orbiting the newly formed Sun. It formed via accretion, where planetesimals and other smaller rocky bodies collided and stuck, gradually growing into a planet. This process generated an enormous amount of heat, which caused early Earth to melt completely. As planetary accretion slowed, Earth began to cool, forming its first crust, called a primary or primordial crust. This crust was likely repeatedly destroyed by large impacts, then reformed from the magma ocean left by the impact. None of Earth's primary crust has survived to today; all was destroyed by erosion, impacts, and plate tectonics over the past several billion years.

Since then, Earth has been forming secondary and tertiary crust, which correspond to oceanic and continental crust respectively. Secondary crust forms at mid-ocean spreading centers, where partial-melting of the underlying mantle yields basaltic magmas and new ocean crust forms. This "ridge push" is one of the driving forces of plate tectonics, and it is constantly creating new ocean crust. Consequently, old crust must be destroyed, so opposite a spreading center, there is usually a subduction zone: a trench where an ocean plate is sinking back into the mantle. This constant process of creating new ocean crust and destroying old ocean crust means that the oldest ocean crust on Earth today is only about 200 million years old.

In contrast, the bulk of the continental crust is much older. The oldest continental crustal rocks on Earth have ages in the range from about 3.7 to 4.28 billion years  and have been found in the Narryer Gneiss Terrane in Western Australia, in the Acasta Gneiss in the Northwest Territories on the Canadian Shield, and on other cratonic regions such as those on the Fennoscandian Shield. Some zircon with age as great as 4.3 billion years has been found in the Narryer Gneiss Terrane. Continental crust is tertiary crust, formed at subduction zones through recycling of subducted secondary (oceanic) crust.

The average age of Earth's current continental crust has been estimated to be about 2.0 billion years. Most crustal rocks formed before 2.5 billion years ago are located in cratons. Such old continental crust and the underlying mantle asthenosphere are less dense than elsewhere in Earth and so are not readily destroyed by subduction. Formation of new continental crust is linked to periods of intense orogeny, which coincide with the formation of the supercontinents such as Rodinia, Pangaea and Gondwana. The crust forms in part by aggregation of island arcs including granite and metamorphic fold belts, and it is preserved in part by depletion of the underlying mantle to form buoyant lithospheric mantle.  Crustal movement on continents may result in earthquakes, while movement under the seabed can lead to tidal waves.

See also 

 Brittle–ductile transition zone
 Solid earth
 Internal structure of Earth

References

External links 

 

 
Structure of the Earth